Shakur Asiatic Juiston (born March 31, 1996) is an American professional basketball player for Baskets Oldenburg of the Basketball Bundesliga. He played college basketball for Hutchinson, UNLV, and Oregon.

High school career
Juiston began his high school career at Irvington High School, where he averaged 10 points per game during his freshman season. As a sophomore, he averaged 13.3 points per game. For his junior season, Juiston transferred to Eastside High School and averaged 11.5 points per game. As a senior, he averaged 12.5 points per game and helped lead the Ghosts to a 25-7 season and a sectional title. Juiston signed with Hutchinson Community College out of high school.

College career
Juiston averaged 10.9 points and 7.5 rebounds per game for Hutchinson as a freshman. As a sophomore, he averaged 17.3 points, 12.1 rebounds, 3.9 assists, 1.5 steals and 1.8 blocks per game, leading the Blue Dragons to the NJCAA Division I championship. Juiston was named the NABC NJCAA Player of the Year. He transferred to UNLV. As a junior, Juiston averaged 14.6 points and 10.0 rebounds per game, shooting 63.9 percent from the floor. He was named to the Second Team All-Mountain West Conference. In the first eight games of his senior season, he averaged 10.8 points and 8.8 rebounds per game. Juiston suffered a torn meniscus against Illinois on December 8, 2018, forcing him to have season-ending surgery. After the season he transferred to Oregon as a graduate transfer. He missed five games in December 2019 with a leg injury. Juiston averaged 7.9 points and 6.3 rebounds per game as a redshirt senior.

Professional career
On February 19, 2021, Juiston was acquired by the Memphis Hustle of the NBA G League. 

On September 1, 2021, Juiston signed with Aris of the Greek Basket League. In 25 league games, he averaged 9.8 points, 7.6 rebounds, 1 assist, 0.6 blocks and 1.4 steals, playing around 24 minutes per contest.

On June 26, 2022, Juiston signed with Peristeri of the Greek Basket League and the Basketball Champions League.

On February 11, 2023, he signed with Baskets Oldenburg of the Basketball Bundesliga.

References

External links
Oregon Ducks bio
UNLV Runnin' Rebels bio

1996 births
Living people
American expatriate basketball people in Greece
American men's basketball players
Aris B.C. players
Basketball players from Newark, New Jersey
Centers (basketball)
Eastside High School (Paterson, New Jersey) alumni
Hutchinson Blue Dragons men's basketball players
Irvington High School (New Jersey) alumni
Memphis Hustle players
Oregon Ducks men's basketball players
People from Irvington, New Jersey
People from Paterson, New Jersey
Peristeri B.C. players
Power forwards (basketball)
Sportspeople from Newark, New Jersey
Sportspeople from Passaic County, New Jersey
UNLV Runnin' Rebels basketball players